Teleonemia scrupulosa, the lantana lace bug, is a species of lace bug in the family Tingidae. It is found in Africa, Australia, the Caribbean, Central America, North America, Oceania, South America, and Southern Asia.

Subspecies
 Teleonemia scrupulosa haytiensis Drake, 1920
 Teleonemia scrupulosa scrupulosa Stål, 1873

References

Further reading

 
 
 

Tingidae
Insects described in 1873